Omm ol Savad (also Romanized as Omm ol Savād, Omm os Savād, Om Sovād, and Ommolsavād; also known as Kharābehhā-ye Savādā, Savād, Suwadah, and Suwadeh) is a village in Gharb-e Karun Rural District, in the Central District of Khorramshahr County, Khuzestan Province, Iran. At the 2006 census, its population was 213  (comprised by 31 families).

References 

Populated places in Khorramshahr County